Pelargonium exstipulatum is a pelargonium species native to South Africa. It is in the subgenus Reniforme along with Pelargonium odoratissimum and Pelargonium sidoides.

Etymology
Pelargonium comes from the Greek; Pelargos which means stork. Another name for pelargoniums is storksbills due to the shape of their fruit. Exstipulatum refers to the lack of Stipules on the leaves.

Description
Pelargonium exstipulatum is a tall, quite woody, 'shrublet' which grows up to metre high and 50 cm wide. It has small pink flowers and its leaves are waxy, green and ovate with a slight fringe. Its leaves have a sweet, slightly spicy scent.

Cultivars and hybrids
There are only a few cultivars and hybrids of Pelargonium odoratissimum, these include:

Pelargonium × fragrans - A hybrid between P. exstipulatum and P.odoratissimum.
There are many varieties and cultivars of P. × fragrans. For a detailed list, see Pelargonium × fragrans

Uses
As well as being a houseplant or outdoor perennial depending on climate, the leaves of Pelargonium exstipulatum can be used in something like potpourri as they are quite aromatic.

References

exstipulatum
Taxa named by Antonio José Cavanilles